Ponti sul Mincio is a comune (municipality) in the Province of Mantua in the Italian region Lombardy, located about  east of Milan and about  northwest of Mantua.

Ponti sul Mincio borders the following municipalities: Monzambano, Peschiera del Garda, Pozzolengo, Valeggio sul Mincio.

Demographic evolution

References

External links
 www.comune.pontisulmincio.mn.it/

Cities and towns in Lombardy